Puccio di Simone (fl. 1346–1358) was an Italian Gothic painter, active in Florence.

Biography
Puccio di Simone is also known as the Master of the Fabriano Altarpiece. He was a student of Bernardo Daddi in Florence. He is mentioned between 1348 and 1357. He appears to have collaborated with Allegretto Nuzi in Fabriano.

Work

Work by Puccio di Simone can be found in:
Coronation of the Virgin, Museum of Fine Arts, Ghent, Belgium 
Madonna, Petit Palais, Avignon, France
Madonna and Child, Montor Collection, Paris, France 
Madonna and Saints (polyptych), Museum of Sacred Art, Certaldo, Italy
St Anthony altarpiece (1353), Pinacoteca of Fabriano, Italy
Triptych of Madonna with Saints Laurentius, Onuphrius, Jacobus and Barthomoleus,  Accademia, Florence, Italy
Saints Lucia and Catherine, Galleria di Palazzo degli Alberti, Prato, Italy
St Ansano and two angels, Church of Saint Giovanni Battista and Saint Ansano, Vinci, Italy  
Madonna with angels and saints, National Gallery of Art Washington D.C., USA  
St James Major, Seattle Art Museum Seattle, Washington, USA
Crucifixion, Snite Museum of Art, University of Notre Dame, Notre Dame, Indiana, USA
Adoration of the Kings, Worcester Art Museum, Massachusetts, USA

Further reading
 (see index; plate 27)

Notes

14th-century Italian painters
Italian male painters
Painters from Florence
Gothic painters
Trecento painters
14th-century births
14th-century deaths